

Density, solid phase

In the following table, the use row is the value recommended for use in other Wikipedia pages in order to maintain consistency across content.

Density, liquid phase

Density, gas phase

Notes 
 The suggested values for solid densities refer to "near room temperature (r.t.)" by default.
 The suggested values for liquid densities refer to "at the melting point (m.p.)" by default.

See also
 Hardnesses of the elements (data page)

References

WEL
As quoted at http://www.webelements.com/ from these sources:
A.M. James and M.P. Lord in Macmillan's Chemical and Physical Data, Macmillan, London, UK, 1992.
D.R. Lide, (ed.) in Chemical Rubber Company handbook of chemistry and physics, CRC Press, Boca Raton, Florida, USA, 77th edition, 1996.
J.A. Dean (ed) in Lange's Handbook of Chemistry, McGraw-Hill, New York, USA, 14th edition, 1992.
G.W.C. Kaye and T.H. Laby in Tables of physical and chemical constants, Longman, London, UK, 15th edition, 1993.

CRC
As quoted from various sources in an online version of:
David R. Lide (ed), CRC Handbook of Chemistry and Physics, 84th Edition. CRC Press. Boca Raton, Florida, 2003; Section 4, Properties of the Elements and Inorganic Compounds; Physical Constants of Inorganic Compounds

CR2
David R. Lide (ed), CRC Handbook of Chemistry and Physics, 84th Edition. CRC Press. Boca Raton, Florida, 2003; Section 4, Properties of the Elements and Inorganic Compounds; Density of Molten Elements and Representative Salts

LNG
As quoted from an online version of:
J.A. Dean (ed), Lange's Handbook of Chemistry (15th Edition), McGraw-Hill, 1999; Section 3; Table 3.2 Physical Constants of Inorganic Compounds

VDW
The following molar volumes and densities for the majority of the gaseous elements were calculated from the van der Waals equation of state, using the quoted values of the van der Waals constants. The source for the van der Waals constants and for the literature densities was: R. C. Weast (Ed.), Handbook of Chemistry and Physics (53rd Edn.), Cleveland:Chemical Rubber Co., 1972.

Donnelly et al.

Hoffer et al.

Other
KCH: Kuchling, Horst, Taschenbuch der Physik, 13. Auflage, Verlag Harri Deutsch, Thun und Frankfurt/Main, German edition, 1991. 
 (a) Gray and Ramsay, Proceedings of the Royal Society (London). A. Mathematical and Physical Sciences. 84: 536; (1911)

Properties of chemical elements
Chemical element data pages